Purna Daichapra (also known as Lahkar Para) is a village of Nalbari district in Western Assam. This village is situated in the border of Nalbari and Kamrup District.

Culture

Language
The primary language used in Purna Daichapra is Kamrupi, as in Nalbari district and Kamrup region.

Festivals
Holi, Janmastami, Shivratri, etc. are celebrated with much fanfare. Vedic culture is widespread in day-to-day life. Many old temples, such as Daul Mandir and Hanuman Mandir, can be found in this area.

Education
There is a high school in Purna Daichapra named P B Lahkar Para High School and a lower primary School named Lahkar Para Pateswari LPS.

Transport
The village is well connected to Nalbari and Gauhati by regular buses, trekkers and other privately owned vehicles in north and accessible through Dimu-Baharghat road.

Notable people 
 Engineer & Social Media Activist Biraj Lahkar

See also
 Villages of Nalbari District

External links
 

Villages in Nalbari district